Mark Freedland is professor of employment law at the University of Oxford and a fellow and tutor of St John's College.

On 1 October 2005, he commenced a special Leverhulme Major Research Fellowship in which he is working towards a re-framing of the law of personal work contracts in the context of European law and the contemporary labour market. Freedland is also a published academic author.

Notable publications
Freedland, M., From the Contract of Employment to the Personal Work Nexus, (2006) 35 Industrial Law Journal 1
Freedland, M., The Personal Employment Contract, 2003,  
Freedland, M., Sciarra, S., Public Services and Citizenship in European Law - Public and Labour Law Perspectives, Oxford University Press, 1998, 
Freedland, M., The Personal Employment Contract (Oxford Monographs on Labour Law), Oxford University Press, 2005, 
Freedland, M., Sciarra, S., Davies, P., Employment Policy and the Regulation of Part-time Work in the European Union: A Comparative Analysis, Cambridge University Press, 2004, 
Freedland, M., Auby, J., The Public Law/private Law Divide: Une Entente Cordiale? (Studies of the Oxford Institute of European & Comparative Law), Hart Publishing, 2006, 
Freedland, M., Davies, P., Labour Legislation and Public Policy: A Contemporary History, Clarendon Press, 1999,

External links
Mark Freedland at Oxford Law 
Mark Freedland at St John's College

Year of birth missing (living people)
Date of birth missing (living people)
Place of birth missing (living people)
Living people
English lawyers
Fellows of St John's College, Oxford
British legal scholars
Legal scholars of the University of Oxford